Samuel Child (1693 – 1 October 1752) was an English banker and politician. He served as Member of Parliament (MP) for Bishop's Castle from 1747 to 1752.

Child was the 11th son of Sir Francis Child, a banker, MP, and Lord Mayor of London in 1698. He was a partner in the family bank Child & Co. until the death in 1740 of his brother Francis, when he became head of the bank.

At the 1747 general election, he was invited to stand as a Tory candidate for Middlesex, where his family owned land. However, he had previously promised his support to Sir Roger Newdigate, and instead stood for Bishop's Castle. The borough's patron, John Walcot, borrowed £8,500 (£ in ) from Child's bank, and Child was returned unopposed.

After his death in October 1752, aged 59, he was succeeded as head of the bank firstly by his son Francis, and after Francis's death in 1763 by his younger son Robert.

References 
 

1693 births
1752 deaths
Samuel
British MPs 1747–1754
Members of the Parliament of Great Britain for English constituencies